In theoretical physics, extended supersymmetry is supersymmetry whose infinitesimal generators  carry not only a spinor index , but also an additional index  where  is integer (such as 2 or 4).

Extended supersymmetry is also called ,  supersymmetry, for example. Extended supersymmetry is very important for analysis of mathematical properties of quantum field theory and superstring theory.  The more extended supersymmetry is, the more it constrains physical observables and parameters.

See also
 Supersymmetry algebra
 Harmonic superspace
 Projective superspace

Supersymmetry